Dusmáta Takács (born 15 November 1986 in Dunaújváros) is a former Hungarian handballer.

Achievements
Magyar Kupa:
Bronze Medallist: 2009

References

External links
 Dusmáta Takács career statistics on Worldhandball.com

1986 births
Living people
Hungarian female handball players
Sportspeople from Dunaújváros
21st-century Hungarian women